P. californicus  may refer to:
 Paralichthys californicus, the California halibut or California flounder, a large-tooth flounder species native to the waters of the Pacific Coast of North America 
 Parastichopus californicus, a synonym of the California sea cucumber (Apostichopus californicus), a sea cucumber species found from the Gulf of Alaska to Southern California
 Penstemon californicus, the California penstemon, a plant species native to Baja California
 Peromyscus californicus, the California mouse, a rodent species found in north-western Mexico and central to southern California
 Phidippus californicus, a jumping spider species found in the southwestern United States
 Platystemon californicus, the creamcup, a plant species native to Oregon, California, Arizona, Utah and Baja California
 Pleuropogon californicus, the annual semaphoregrass, a grass species endemic to northern California
 Poebrodon californicus, an extinct terrestrial herbivore species endemic to North America from the Pliocene through Pleistocene
 Poecilanthrax californicus, a fly species in the genus Poecilanthrax
 Pogonomyrmex californicus, an ant species in the genus Pogonomyrmex

See also
 List of Latin and Greek words commonly used in systematic names#C